The red encrusting sponge (Clathria oudekraalensis) is a species of sea sponge. It is known only from the South African coast, on both sides of the Cape Peninsula. It is endemic to this region.

Description
The red encrusting sponge grows to about 1 cm in thickness and up to 30 cm wide. It is a bright red encrusting sponge. Its surface is smooth and the oscula are not visible.

Habitat
This sponge lives on rocky reefs in 6-24m of water.

References

Poecilosclerida
Animals described in 2005